Henry-Jean Baptiste (3 January 1933 in Fort-de-France, Martinique – 5 January 2018 in Paris) was a French politician from Martinique who was elected and represented Mayotte in the French National Assembly from 1986 to 2002.

References

 Page on the French National Assembly website

1933 births
2018 deaths
People from Fort-de-France
Martiniquais politicians
Union for French Democracy politicians
Deputies of the 8th National Assembly of the French Fifth Republic
Deputies of the 9th National Assembly of the French Fifth Republic
Deputies of the 10th National Assembly of the French Fifth Republic
Deputies of the 11th National Assembly of the French Fifth Republic
Sciences Po alumni
École nationale d'administration alumni
Deputies from Mayotte